Anthony Russo (born February 3, 1970) and Joseph Russo (born July 18, 1971), collectively known as the Russo brothers, are American directors, producers, and screenwriters. They direct most of their work together. They are best known for directing four films in the Marvel Cinematic Universe (MCU): Captain America: The Winter Soldier (2014), Captain America: Civil War (2016), Avengers: Infinity War (2018), and Avengers: Endgame (2019). Endgame grossed over $2.798 billion worldwide, becoming one of the highest-grossing films of all time.

The brothers have also worked as directors and producers on the comedy series Arrested Development (2003–2005), Community (2009–2014), and Happy Endings (2011–2012). They won a Primetime Emmy Award for Arrested Development.

Early life
Anthony Russo (born February 3, 1970) and Joseph Russo (born July 18, 1971) were born and raised in Cleveland, Ohio, the sons of Patricia Gallupoli and attorney and judge Basil Russo. Their parents were both of Italian descent. Their paternal and maternal families emigrated from Sicily and Abruzzo, respectively, and settling in Ohio. They attended Benedictine High School. Joe graduated from the University of Iowa and majored in English and writing, while Anthony graduated from the University of Pennsylvania and majored in business before switching to English.

Career 
The Russo brothers were graduate students at Case Western Reserve University (where Anthony studied law and Joe studied acting) when they began directing, writing, and producing their first feature, Pieces. They financed the film with student loans and credit cards. After viewing Pieces at the Slamdance Film Festival, Steven Soderbergh approached the duo and offered to produce their next film, along with his producing partner George Clooney. This project was the crime comedy Welcome to Collinwood, starring William H. Macy, Sam Rockwell, and Clooney.

FX network executive Kevin Reilly hired the Russos to direct the pilot for the series Lucky, having liked the pair's work on Collinwood. Ron Howard was a fan of the pilot, and he had a hand in hiring the brothers to direct the pilot for Fox's Arrested Development. The brothers won a Primetime Emmy Award for their work on the episode, and would go on to direct episodes on the first few seasons of the series.

In 2006, the Russo brothers returned to film, directing the Owen Wilson comedy You, Me and Dupree. The film grossed $130 million worldwide. For the 2007–08 TV season, the Russos joined the crew of the ABC series Carpoolers as executive producers and directors. The brothers served as executive producers and directors on the first several seasons of the NBC sitcom Community and the ABC series Happy Endings.

By June 2012, the Russos were in final talks to direct Marvel Studios' second Captain America movie. The brothers wrapped principal production on Captain America: The Winter Soldier in July 2013 and the film was released on April 4, 2014. In January 2014, the brothers signed on to return to direct the third Captain America film, Captain America: Civil War, which was released on May 6, 2016. In May 2014, they were announced to co-write and direct The Gray Man. In March 2015, the brothers were set to direct an all-male counterpart to Paul Feig's all-female Ghostbusters reboot, which would be produced by Sony's new-founded production company, Ghost Corps. However, as of March 2016, the Russos were no longer attached to the Ghostbusters project. In 2015, they signed a deal with Sony.

The Russo brothers directed Avengers: Infinity War (2018), which became the first superhero movie to gross over $2 billion at the box office. They are the third directors to make a $2 billion movie after James Cameron's films Avatar and Titanic and J. J. Abrams's film Star Wars: The Force Awakens. Its sequel, Avengers: Endgame, was released on April 26, 2019, broke numerous box office records, and became the second superhero movie to gross over $2 billion. They join James Cameron as the only directors to make two $2 billion films. Joe Russo said while promoting Avengers: Endgame, "Both the films ask the question, what is the cost of being a hero? The films are about community and heroes standing up against tyranny. We certainly look at that as waves of nationalism sweep the world." They have also directed the post-credits scene of Ant-Man and the mid-credits scene of Captain Marvel.

The brothers are financing the Los Angeles and Beijing joint-production company Anthem & Song, which is producing the Chinese superhero film The Hero's Awakening.

The Russo brothers produced the television show Deadly Class, a Sony Pictures Television-produced adaptation of the comic book series of the same name. The show was aired on the Syfy channel. Benedict Wong, Benjamin Wadsworth, Lana Condor, Michel Duval and María Gabriela de Faría were among the actors cast in main roles for the series. On April 18, 2018, Syfy picked up the pilot to the series. On June 4, 2019, the show was canceled.

In August 2018, the brothers won the rights to adapt Nico Walker's 2018 novel Cherry. They also served as award presenters at The Game Awards 2018 ceremony, which honored the best video games of that year. In March 2019, it was confirmed that Tom Holland was confirmed to play the lead role in Cherry. On April 10, 2019, it was announced that brothers would helm a new remake of Poltergeist.

In June 2019, the Russo brothers were announced as the new executive producers for the unnamed Netflix animated series based on the Magic: The Gathering trading card game. “We have been huge fans and players of Magic: The Gathering for as long as it has been around, so being able to help bring these stories to life through animation is a true passion project for us,” the Russos said in a press statement. However, in August 2021, it was announced that the Russos would no longer be involved with the project.

The Russos also served as producers of the film Everything Everywhere All At Once, written and directed by Daniel Kwan and Daniel Scheinert. The film, released in theatres in March 2022, is A24's highest-grossing film worldwide at the box office. 

By July 2020, the Russos were hired to direct an adaptation of Matt Greaney's The Gray Man for Netflix, from a screenplay by Joe Russo, with Christopher Markus and Stephen McFeely to further polish the script, and actors Ryan Gosling and Chris Evans attached to star. The film premiered on Netflix on July 22, 2022.

The Russos are developing a spy series called Citadel for Amazon Prime, which will star Priyanka Chopra and Richard Madden. The show will also have local-language versions in Mexico, India, and Italy. In April 2020, it was announced that they would be producing a live-action film adaptation of Disney's Hercules. In December 2020, it was announced that the Russos will direct an adaptation of Simon Stålenhag's graphic novel The Electric State for Universal Pictures with Millie Bobby Brown set to star. The duo will also produce an animated film based on the book Superfudge alongside Disney Television Animation for Disney+. In June 2022, the film adaptation The Electric State had landed at Netflix.

Filmography

Film

Television

Other
Fortnite Battle Royale - Season 6, Chapter 2 opening cinematic (co-directed, March 2021).

Joe Russo's acting credits

See also
List of highest-grossing film directors

Notes

References

External links 

 
 

Action film directors
American film directors
American people of Italian descent
American film editors
American male screenwriters
American television directors
Television producers from Ohio
Artists from Cleveland
Case Western Reserve University alumni
English-language film directors
Film producers from Ohio
Filmmaking duos
Living people
Place of birth missing (living people)
Primetime Emmy Award winners
Screenwriters from Ohio
Sibling duos
Sibling filmmakers
Year of birth missing (living people)
American writers of Italian descent